Jacob Michael Kunkel (July 13, 1822 – April 7, 1870) was a US Representative from Maryland.

Born in Frederick, Maryland, Kunkel attended the Frederick Academy for Boys and graduated from the University of Virginia at Charlottesville in 1843.
He studied law, was admitted to the bar, and began to practice in Frederick in 1846. He went on to serve in the Maryland Senate from 1850 to 1856.

Kunkel was elected as a Democrat to the Thirty-fifth and Thirty-sixth Congresses (March 4, 1857 – March 3, 1861).

Afterward, he resumed the practice of law in his native city. He served as delegate to the Loyalist Convention in Philadelphia in 1866. He died in Frederick, Maryland.

References

1822 births
1870 deaths
Democratic Party Maryland state senators
University of Virginia alumni
Politicians from Frederick, Maryland
Maryland lawyers
Democratic Party members of the United States House of Representatives from Maryland
Burials at Mount Olivet Cemetery (Frederick, Maryland)
19th-century American politicians
19th-century American lawyers